The Penny Hoarder is an American personal finance website and brand based in St. Petersburg, Florida. Owned by Clearlink, The Penny Hoarder publishes multimedia content about different ways people can make and save money. Founder and CEO Kyle Taylor started the website in 2010.

History

In 2004, Kyle Taylor was a political science major at the University of South Florida. He campaigned for Working America as a freshman, and later worked for Clean Water Action. The next year, Taylor dropped out ahead of his second semester when he was offered a promotion and opportunity to work on a park bond campaign in Texas. Taylor spent the next several years working on different campaigns across the country. Due to the nature of the work being sporadic and short-lived, he looked for side gigs while on the campaign trail to supplement, or in some cases replace, his income. Taylor returned to Florida after a few years on the road and started accepting gigs on Craigslist. With $50,000 worth of student-loan and credit-card debt, he started The Penny Hoarder to document the different ways he was making money.

In 2015, his umbrella company and media startup, Taylor Media, acqui-hired Socialexis, a blog management firm founded by Alexis Grant. Taylor opened an office in St. Petersburg, Florida, and began building an in-house team. In the next five years, The Penny Hoarder grew to 10 million monthly unique visitors and maintained a Facebook audience of 7 million.

In December 2020, Clearlink acquired The Penny Hoarder for $102.5 million.

Leadership
The Penny Hoarder is led by Kyle Taylor, founder and CEO; Sharon Prill, chief operating officer; Curt Dailey, vice president of revenue operations; John Schlander, managing editor; and Wendy Dittamore, senior director of audience development.

Prior to The Penny Hoarder, Prill was Chief Operating Officer at VitalWare, a healthcare revenue cycle SaaS solutions provider. A former group publisher and head of digital operations, Prill has over 18 years of product, media, sales and marketing leadership experience. Prill worked at several leading media companies, including The Seattle Times, Journal Communications and McClatchy Company.

Before The Penny Hoarder, Dailey worked at Nielsen Media Research, where his responsibilities included operations leadership, resource management, budgeting and forecasting.

Schlander was a 32-year veteran of the Tampa Bay Times (formerly called the St. Petersburg Times) before joining The Penny Hoarder editorial team in August 2016.

Dittamore was senior director of audience development at CNET Media Group before joining parent company Clearlink in September 2021.

Content
The Penny Hoarder publishes articles and multimedia content about ways to make, save and manage money. The Penny Hoarder's target audience are readers who make less than the average household income and may feel alienated by most finance publications.

The Penny Hoarder typically publishes about 20 articles a week, ranging various financial topics. Topics featured on the website include “Make Money,” “Save Money,” “Budgeting,” "Debt," “Retirement,” "Credit Scores," "Bank Accounts," "Investing," "Home Buying," "Taxes," and “Insurance.”

In addition to written articles on the website, The Penny Hoarder produces videos and infographics that appear on the site and on social media, as well as a daily email newsletter and SMS alerts.

References

External links
 

Financial services companies established in 2010
Finance websites
Internet properties established in 2010
Companies based in St. Petersburg, Florida
2010 establishments in Florida